Erasmus Bible may refer to:

 Novum Instrumentum omne, an edition of the New Testament by Erasmus
 Textus Receptus, all editions of the Novum Instrumentum omne